Eric Schambari (born April 22, 1978) is an American professional mixed martial artist who competes in the middleweight division. A professional MMA competitor since 2005, Schambari has most notably fought in World Extreme Cagefighting and was a semi-finalist in the Bellator Season Two: Middleweight Tournament, where he was eliminated by Bryan Baker.

Mixed martial arts career

Background

Schambari began his career in 2005 and compiled a record of 5–0 in local promotions before joining the WEC. Schambari trains at Marc Laimon's Cobra Kai gym in Victorville, California. Schambari has trained with the likes of Travis Lutter, Joe Stevenson and Guy Mezger.

On December 20, 2014, Eric received his black belt in Brazilian jiu-jitsu from Travis Lutter.

World Extreme Cagefighting

Schambari signed for the WEC and made his debut on the undercard of WEC 27 against Art Santore. In a close fight, Schambari took the unanimous decision (30–27, 30–27 and 29–28), which was suggested to be due to Schambari's superior cardio and slight advantage in damage caused.

He then fought Logan Clark at WEC 29. Schambari once again took the unanimous decision (all three judges scoring the bout 29–28). However, this decision was viewed as slightly controversial considering that Clark was able to do more damage from the bottom with up-kicks, in addition to locking in a gogoplata and an omoplata.

Schambari suffered his first career defeat, losing to Bryan Baker via split decision at WEC 31 in December 2007.

Soon after, Schambari was injured in training and suffered an allergic reaction to medication that nearly cost him his life and career. Later, he returned to training and competition against the advice of his doctors.

This injury, combined with the dissolution of the middleweight division in the WEC, after its purchase by the UFC, led to his release. Schambari then fought in smaller promotions, defeating four fighters (three via first round submission and one via majority decision). The latter of these victories saw Schambari headline an event, competing against Will Espich in San Juan, Puerto Rico. This fight saw Schambari win via submission (arm-triangle choke).

Bellator Fighting Championship

Schambari then signed for Bellator and entered into their Middleweight tournament. There, he was joined by the only man to have defeated him at this point in his career, Bryan Baker.

In the first round of the tournament, Schambari faced The Ultimate Fighter 7 competitor Luke Zachrich. Schambari was far more effective and after 3:34 of the first round, Schambari locked in an arm-triangle choke and forced the tap-out.

This advanced Schambari into the semi-finals of the tournament where he would have a rematch with Bryan Baker. This fight took place at Bellator 20 and Baker was again the winner, this time via triangle choke at 2:29 of the first round. Schambari was successful with an early takedown, however, Baker worked well from his back and managed to secure the submission. This eliminated Schambari from the tournament.

Returning in Bellator's third season in September 2010 at Bellator 28, Schambari faced the veteran Matt Horwich. Schambari won the fight via split decision after utilizing an effective jab-and-run strategy.

Mixed martial arts record

|-
|Loss
|align=center| 15–6
|Marcus Sursa
|Submission (triangle choke)
|C3 Fights - Rock Em Sock Em Weekend
| 
|align=center|3
|align=center|2:07
|Clinton, Oklahoma, United States
|
|-
|Loss
|align=center| 15–5
|Bubba McDaniel
|Decision (unanimous)
| Fight Game - Premier Event
| 
|align=center| 3
|align=center| 5:00
|Frisco, Texas, United States
|
|-
|Loss 
|align=center| 15–4 
|Andrew Craig
| Decision (unanimous)
| Legacy FC 8
| 
|align=center| 3 
|align=center| 5:00 
|Houston, Texas, United States
| For Legacy FC Middleweight Championship
|- 
| Loss
|align=center| 15–3
| Anthony Smith
| TKO (punches)
| C3 Fights: MMA Championship Fights
| 
|align=center| 1
|align=center| 1:46
|Concho, Oklahoma, United States
|
|- 
| Win
|align=center| 15–2
| Edwin Aguilar
| Submission (heel hook)
| XCage: Predators
| 
|align=center| 1
|align=center| 1:26
|Concho, Oklahoma, United States
|
|-
| Win
|align=center| 14–2
| John Bryant
| Submission (arm-triangle choke)
| C3 Fights: Slammin Jammin Weekend 6
| 
|align=center| 2
|align=center| 1:14
|Newkirk, Oklahoma, United States
| 
|-
| Win
|align=center| 13–2
| Matt Horwich
| Decision (split)
| Bellator 28
| 
|align=center| 3
|align=center| 5:00
|New Orleans, Louisiana, United States
| 
|-
| Loss
|align=center| 12–2
| Bryan Baker
| Submission (triangle choke)
| Bellator 20
| 
|align=center| 1
|align=center| 2:29
|San Antonio, Texas, United States
| Middleweight Tournament Semifinal
|-
| Win
|align=center| 12–1
| Luke Zachrich
| Submission (arm-triangle choke)
| Bellator 16
| 
|align=center| 1
|align=center| 3:34
|Kansas City, Missouri, United States
| Middleweight Tournament Quarterfinal
|-
| Win
|align=center| 11–1
| Will Espich
| Submission (arm-triangle choke)
| Maximo Fighting Championship
| 
|align=center| 1
|align=center| 1:44
|San Juan, Puerto Rico
| 
|-
| Win
|align=center| 10–1
| Dominic Brown
| Submission (rear-naked choke)
| C3: Slammin Jammin Weekend 1
| 
|align=center| 1
|align=center| 1:04
|Newkirk, Oklahoma, United States
| 
|-
| Win
|align=center| 9–1
| Nate James
| Decision (majority)
| Slammin Jammin Weekend 3
| 
|align=center| 3
|align=center| 3:00
|Newkirk, Oklahoma, United States
| 
|-
| Win
|align=center| 8–1
| John Bryant
| Submission (rear-naked choke)
| C3 Fights
| 
|align=center| 1
|align=center| 2:57
|Newkirk, Oklahoma, United States
| 
|-
| Loss
|align=center| 7–1
| Bryan Baker
| Decision (split)
| WEC 31
| 
|align=center| 3
|align=center| 5:00
|Las Vegas, Nevada, United States
| 
|-
| Win
|align=center| 7–0
| Logan Clark
| Decision (unanimous)
| WEC 29
| 
|align=center| 3
|align=center| 5:00
|Las Vegas, Nevada, United States
|
|-
| Win
|align=center| 6–0
| Art Santore
| Decision (unanimous)
| WEC 27
| 
|align=center| 3
|align=center| 5:00
|Las Vegas, Nevada, United States
| 
|-
| Win
|align=center| 5–0
| Christian Smith
| Submission (arm triangle choke)
| Art of War 1
| 
|align=center| 1
|align=center| 3:12
|Dallas, Texas, United States
| 
|-
| Win
|align=center| 4–0
| Ricardeau Francois
| Submission
| International Freestyle Fighting 1
| 
|align=center| 1
|align=center| 4:30
|Fort Worth, Texas, United States
| 
|-
| Win
|align=center| 3–0
| Corey Salter
| TKO (punches)
| Ultimate Texas Showdown 4
| 
|align=center| 1
|align=center| 1:19
|Texas, United States
| 
|-
| Win
|align=center| 2–0
| Sherman Pendergarst
| Decision (unanimous)
| Inferno Promotions: Meltdown
| 
|align=center| 3
|align=center| 5:00
|Dallas, Texas, United States
| 
|-
| Win
|align=center| 1–0
| Jamey Herbert
| Submission (kimura)
| Inferno Promotions: Meltdown
| 
|align=center| 1
|align=center| N/A
|Dallas, Texas, United States
|

References

External links

1978 births
Living people
American male mixed martial artists
People from Victorville, California
Middleweight mixed martial artists
Mixed martial artists utilizing Brazilian jiu-jitsu
American practitioners of Brazilian jiu-jitsu
People awarded a black belt in Brazilian jiu-jitsu